Erik Nelson may refer to:
 Erik Nelson (songwriter), American songwriter, music producer and recording engineer
 Erik Nelson (filmmaker), American filmmaker
 Eric Nelson (musician), American choral conductor, clinician, and composer
 Erik Nelson (soccer), soccer player, see 2006 U.S. Open Cup
 Erik Nelson (basketball), see EuroCup Basketball MVP of the Round